Tambov Oblast is a federal subject of Russia (an oblast). Its administrative center is the city of Tambov. As of the 2010 Census, its population was 1,091,994.

Geography
Tambov Oblast is situated in a forest steppe. It borders the Ryazan, Penza, Saratov, Voronezh and Lipetsk oblasts.

History
The oldest known population of the Tambov region, the Mordovians-Moksha, formed as a nation of local ethnic groups from the 6th century BC. The first Russian settlers arrived in the pre-Mongol period, but the final settlement occurred in the 17th century. To protect the southern borders of Russia from the raids of the Tatars, and to further develop the Black Soil region, the Russian government built the walled cities of Kozlov (1635) and Tambov (1636). The cities protected the main path of nomad raids on Russian land and paved the way for a quick settlement of the region.

Kozlovsky Uyezd originally existed in the Tambov area. In the course of the administrative reforms of Peter the Great in 1708 and 1719, it became part of Azov Governorate. New administrative divisions established the Tambov Viceroyalty in 1779 and from 1796 Tambov Governorate, with an area of 66.5 thousand km2 divided into 12 uyezds. With almost no change to its boundaries, the Governorate remained in existence until 1928.

An attempt to establish Soviet control over the Tambov area led to the defeat and execution of "Red Sonya" (Sofia Nukhimovna Gel'berg) in the spring of 1918.

During the Russian Civil War, an anti-Bolshevik uprising, the Tambov Rebellion, broke out in Tambov Governorate in 1920–1921.

Tambov Oblast was finally created from the Voronezh and Samara Oblasts on September 27, 1937. The oblast attained its present form after the separation of Penza Oblast (formerly part of Kuybyshev before joining Tambov) on February 4, 1939.

Administrative divisions

Demographics
Population: 

2012
Births: 10,394 (9.6 per 1000)
Deaths: 17,386 (16.1 per 1000) 

Total fertility rate
2009: 1.31
2010: 1.34
2011: 1.33
2012: 1.42
2013: 1.42
2014: 1.49
2015: 1.51
2016: 1.49(e)

Ethnic composition (2010)
Russians: 97%
Ukrainians: 0.7%
Armenians: 0.4%
Romani people: 0.4%
Others: 1.5%
22,708 people were registered from administrative databases, and could not declare an ethnicity. It is estimated that the proportion of ethnicities in this group is the same as that of the declared group.

Settlements

Religion

According to a 2012 survey, 78.4% of the population of Tambov Oblast adheres to the Russian Orthodox Church, making it the federal subject with the highest percentage of this religion in the whole country. In addition, 1% are unaffiliated generic Christians, 7% of the population declares to be "spiritual but not religious", 10% is atheist, and 3.6% follows other religions or did not give an answer to the question.

Economy
Southeastern Railway passes through Michurinsk and connects the central regions with the southern regions. Breeding cattle, sheep, pig, and chicken is a product of animal husbandry.

See also
List of Chairmen of the Tambov Oblast Duma

References

Notes

Sources

External links

 Official website of Tambov Oblast
 Photos of Tambov and Tambov Oblast
 

 
Oblasts of Russia
States and territories established in 1937